In social justice theory, internalized oppression is a concept in which an oppressed group accepts the methods and incorporates the oppressive message of the oppressing group against their own best interest. Rosenwasser (2002) defines it as believing, adopting, accepting, and incorporating the negative beliefs provided by the oppressor as the truth. It occurs when a dominating group preemptively displays aggression from a perceived inequality of self-worth compared to the group it wants to dominate with the intention of establishing themselves as a highly-valued/ superior group in order to achieve authority and power, and its benefits, also known as practice of cultural imperialism among many forms of oppression.

Members of marginalized groups as a part of socialisation in an oppressive environment assimilates the oppressive view of their own group, or affirm negative self-stereotypes onto their psyche, and limits their reach socially and reproduces disadvantageous behavior patterns by not engaging in active responsibility for one's own and the group's well-being (e.g. counterspaces),and as a result colludes for forming an "assaulted sense of self." Internalized oppression may manifest on an individual or group level, and may form as base for in-group conflict and further discrimination that can be hurtful and limiting.

It may also exist among immigrants and based upon the transgenerational trauma, it may affect their descendants as well. If the host community devalues a foreigner's ethnic origin, native language or culture, an immigrant is led to feel inferior. This can lead to self-hatred, which manifests itself in an exaggerated conformity to dominant norms. An immigrant may cope to it by assimilating and acculturating.

Types
Internalized racism occurs when a member of a group which is a target of racism assumes a racist attitude towards their own group. It indicates a lack of self-esteem. Internalized racism is an effect of internalized colonialism, in which a colonized people loses its identity and assumes the values of the colonizing society; it may happen gradually, over a long period of time. An example of internalized colonialism is the practice of skin whitening (see colorism) found in the Africa and Asia.

Internalized homophobia, also known as internalized heterosexism, occurs in the LGBT community when individuals adopt a culture's heterosexist attitudes. It has a positive correlation with psychological distress and a negative correlation with self-esteem. Internalized homophobia is strongly associated with guilt and shame (especially among youth) and has been linked to increased anxiety, depression and suicide.

In internalized sexism, individuals (generally women) adopt oppressive attitudes towards their gender which are held by their culture. An example is slut-shaming, where women criticize transgressions of accepted codes of sexual conduct on themselves and other women.

Causes
Internalized oppression "occurs when a person comes to internalize oppressive prejudices and biases about the identity group(s) to which he or she belongs". It occurs when "[s]ocial oppression such as racism, sexism, ableism, classism, heterosexism, gender and religious oppression, and anti-Semitism" are "implanted by and [work] toward the benefit of any dominant group. Internalized oppression "depends on systemically limiting, blocking, and undermining" the "success, innovation, and power" of oppressed individuals or groups. Some individuals will copy (and internalize) "institutionalized rejection of difference," failing "to examine the distortions which result from ... misnaming [these differences] and their effects on human behavior and expectations."

Effects

"If women are surrounded by people who view them as subordinate, incapable, or lacking control over their actions, women are likely to come to understand themselves in a similar way, even if subconsciously." Internalized oppression fosters the beliefs that the self cannot be autonomous, is unworthy of wielding power, and is little more than an object of sexual gratification (see sexual objectification). "Psychological oppression can be damaging to a person's moral relationship with the self ... Since those who have internalized oppressive prejudices often engage in behavior that further perpetuates these biases, internalized oppression is not only a symptom of an oppressive social climate, but it also represents a mechanism for its continued existence". According to University of Massachusetts Amherst doctoral students Valerie Joseph and Tanya O. Williams, "Deep racial self-negation[,] ... internalized racial hatred [and] internalized oppression ... stymied [their] growth as people and scholars [and] inhibited [their] ability to be…profound, strong, and beautiful ..." Individuals can be made to feel "implicated in a project of compliance with the values and goals" of the dominant society. Internalized oppression may also occur in disabled individuals, who may distance themselves from others with disabilities to avoid associating themselves with those who may be viewed by society as "weak" or "lazy". Nabina Liebow wrote, "People of color who internalize stereotypes regarding criminality and moral deviance ... can  ... view themselves as outlaws in the moral community" and may "engage in behavior that further perpetuates these biases ... Fulfilling these stereotypes further pushes someone outside the moral fold and intensifies one's damaged moral identity ... [I]nternalizing stereotypes about criminality and moral deviance can led to a pervasive feeling of guilt ... Persistent feelings of guilt can result in mental-health setbacks such as depression" and "repeated exposure to guilt and similar feelings has been linked with a range of health challenges such as "dysfunctional coping, abdominal obesity, and glucose intolerance complicit in the development of Type 2 diabetes".

Manifestations
According to Audre Lorde, manifestations of internalized oppression include voluntary isolation. She describes the relationship between older members of an oppressed group and younger members of the same group as "contemptible or suspect or excess." This generation gap leads to "historical amnesia", with oppressed minorities repeating the learning process and failing to convey knowledge to subsequent generations. Lorde cites oppressed individuals as "encouraged to pluck out some one aspect of [one]self and present this as the meaningful whole, eclipsing or denying the other parts of the self"; they may hesitate to breach the false stereotypes surrounding them or verbalize resistance to violence. The most common manifestation is self-hatred.

Racial manifestations include "multifaceted and extreme psychological, social, and economic self-sabotage"; a tendency to "defer to whites", and feelings of being "not black enough". The self is viewed as a diminished, deviant, criminal and undeserving moral agent. Sandra Bartky identified disturbances in body image, gender expression and power dynamics as manifestations of internalized sexism in women.

Remedies
According to Audre Lorde, "[T]he master's tools will never dismantle the master's house ... My fullest concentration of energy is available to me only when I integrate all the parts of who I am, openly, allowing power from the particular sources of my living to flow back and forth freely through all my different selves, without the restrictions of externally imposed definition". "To root out internalized patterns of oppression" women must "recognize differences among women who are our equals, neither inferior nor superior, and devise ways to use each other's difference to enrich our visions and our joint struggles …to identify and develop new definitions of power and new patterns of relating across difference ... sharpen[ing] self-definition by exposing the self in work and struggle together with those whom we define as different from ourselves, although sharing similar goals".

To understand and overcome internalized oppression, Joseph and Williams developed a workshop to "introduce and discuss issues of socialization, stereotyping, internalized oppression, and domination." This "social justice education model ... encouraged an agent/target model of leadership" in which representatives of the oppressor and oppressed classes joined together to guide "participants in developing a plan of action to address racism." They recommended that fear "left over about discussing race, racism, and internalized racism" be set aside to "talk forthrightly, honestly, reflectively, and thoughtfully about race", and the "need to voice ... hurt, the need to surface realities, the need to shine light on a history that was and continues to be ignored" is greater than the fear of discussing the issues. The internally oppressed must learn how they have been indoctrinated, to "engage in a process of rejecting internalized subordination as an everyday choice".

Related theories

French philosopher Michel Foucault "has argued that the rise of parliamentary institutions and of new conceptions of political liberty was accompanied by a darker counter-movement, by the emergence of a new and unprecedented discipline directed against the body. More is required of the body now than mere political allegiance or the approbation of the products of its labor: the new discipline invades the body and seeks to regulate its very forces and operations, the economy and efficiency of its movements ... the production of 'docile bodies' requires that an uninterrupted coercion be directed to the very processes of bodily activity, not just their result; this 'micro-physics of power' fragments and partitions the body's time, its space, and its movements".

The 18th-century English philosopher Jeremy Bentham's Panopticon is a theoretical model of Foucault's ideas. Its constant state of surveillance, imposed by an oppressive external force, serves to induce in the inmate a state of consciousness and permanent visibility that assures the automatic functioning of power'; each becomes to himself his own jailer".

See also
Learned helplessness 
Passing (racial identity)

Notes

Social justice terminology
Majority–minority relations
Social privilege